Le Mesnil-Simon is a commune in the Calvados department in the Normandy region in northwestern France.

Population

See also
Le Mesnil-Simon, Eure-et-Loir
Communes of the Calvados department

References

Communes of Calvados (department)
Calvados communes articles needing translation from French Wikipedia